Milan Jovanović (born February 5, 1970) is a former WPA and GPC world powerlifting champion and a strongman competitor. He is sometimes known by the nickname Ribcracker. He is also a writer and blogger.

Sporting career
Jovanović started powerlifting in 1998 and won nine Serbian national championships in a row. He achieved his major success in powerlifting at the international level by winning the 2000 WPA  world title in Lancaster, Pennsylvania and the 2003 WPC world title in Wien, Austria when he finished first overall with 936 lbs in squat.

In 2003 Jovanović entered his first Strongman competition, which was held in his native Niš, Serbia. He achieved his major success at the international level in 2005 when he finished fifth overall in the United Strongman Series competition. In 2006 he was injured and retired from competition.

In September 2010 he made a successful return, taking part at the GPC worlds RAW competition held in Prague, Czech Republic.

Personal bests 
 Bench press - 628 pounds (285 kg)
 Squat - 1000 pounds (430 kg)
 Deadlift - 794 pounds (361 kg)

Bodyguarding career
After injury he moved to the United States and became a bodyguard in Miami, Florida, working for celebrities including Mickey Rourke and Kimbo Slice, Shaquille O'Neal, and Jenna Jameson. According to Bas Rutten, Jovanović was also Slice's strength coach.

Writing career
His blog on b92.net is the most visited blog in Serbia. Milan Strongman Jovanovic publishing his texts in Serbian issue of Playboy and newspaper Kurir.

Personal life
Jovanović has three sons and holds a master's degree in electronics at the Faculty of Electronic Engineering University of Niš. He also appeared in several supporting roles in a couple of movies, namely The Parade, The Sisters and Montevideo, vidimo se!.

Acting career

References 

1970 births
Living people
Serbian powerlifters
Serbian bloggers
Serbian strength athletes
Sportspeople from Niš
Sportspeople from Miami
Serbian emigrants to the United States
Male powerlifters